Judson Pentecost Philips (August 10, 1903 – March 7, 1989) was an American writer who wrote more than 100 mystery and detective novels under the pseudonyms Hugh Pentecost and Philip Owen, as well as under his own name. As Judson Philips, he also wrote numerous pulp sports novels in the 1930s.

Biography 
Philips was born in Northfield, Massachusetts, and traveled widely before completing his education and graduating from Columbia University in 1925.

Philips started writing short stories for pulp fiction magazines in the 1920s and 1930s. He also wrote plays and a newspaper column.

He was a prolific mystery writer, especially under the Hugh Pentecost moniker. His novels benefited from strong characterization, fair play with the reader, and unstilted language. He created several series characters, most of them "amateur" sleuths. Perhaps the best known is Pierre Chambrun, the suave manager of a New York luxury hotel who often has to solve murders among the rich and famous.

In 1973, Philips received the Grand Master Award, the highest honor bestowed by the Mystery Writers of America.

An entertaining conversationalist and raconteur, he was well respected in his community and in his literary genre. In 1950, he helped found the Sharon Playhouse, where he served as a producer and adviser. In the mid 1960s he hosted a program about events in Connecticut's "Northwest Corner" on radio station WTOR in Torrington, CT (610kh 1 kW day 500w night DA) which attracted a following.

Phillips died of complications from emphysema in 1989, at age 85, in Canaan, Connecticut. He was survived by his wife, Norma Burton Philips; three sons, David, of Cranston, Connecticut; John, of Washington,, and Daniel, of Fort Lauderdale, Florida; and a daughter, Caroline Norwood of Rochester.

Bibliography

As Judson Philips

Journalist Peter Styles series
Laughter Trap. Dodd, Mead and Company 1964
Black Glass City. Dodd Mead 1965
The Twisted People. Dodd Mead 1965
Wings of Madness. Dodd Mead 1966
Thursday's Folly. Dodd Mead 1967
Hot Summer Killing. Dodd Mead 1968
Nightmare at Dawn. Dodd Mead 1970
Escape a Killer. Dodd Mead 1971, 
The Vanishing Senator. Dodd Mead 1972, 
Larkspur Conspiracy. Dodd Mead 1973, 
The Power Killers. Dodd Mead 1974, 
Walked a Crooked Mile. Dodd Mead 1975, 
Backlash. Dodd Mead 1976, 
Five Roads to Death. Dodd Mead 1977, 
Why Murder. Dodd Mead 1979, 
Death is a Dirty Trick. Dodd Mead 1980, 
Murder as the Curtain Rises. Dodd Mead 1981, 
Target for Tragedy. Dodd Mead 1982,

Standalones
 Red War. Doubleday (publisher) 1936, co-author Thomas M. Johnson
 Death Delivers a Postcard. Hurst and Blackett 1940
 Murder in Marble: a Detective Story. Dodd Mead 1940, also Handi-Book
 Odds on the Hot Seat. Dodd Mead 1941, also Handi-Book
 The Fourteenth Trump. Dodd Mead 1942, also Handi-Book
 Killer on the Catwalk. Dodd Mead 1959
 Whisper Town. Victor Gollancz Ltd 1960
 A Dead Ending. Dodd Mead 1962
 The Dead Can't Love. Dodd Mead 1963
 Murder Arranged. Dodd Mead 1978,

As Hugh Pentecost

Lt. Luke Bradley series
 Cancelled in Red. Dodd Mead 1939
 Twenty-Fourth Horse. Dodd Mead 1940
 I'll Sing at Your Funeral. Dodd Mead 1942
 The Brass Chills. Dodd Mead 1943

Dr. John Smith series
 Memory of Murder. Ziff Davis Inc. 1946, four novellas: 'Memory of Murder'; 'Secret Corridors'; 'Volcano'; 'Fear Unlocked'
 Where the Snow was Red. Dodd Mead 1949
 Shadow of Madness. Dodd Mead 1950

Lt. Pascal series
 Lieutenant Pascal's Tastes in Homicide. Dodd Mead 1954, collection of stories
 The Obituary Club. Dodd Mead 1958
 The Lonely Target. Dodd Mead 1959
 Only the Rich Die Young. Dodd Mead 1964

Uncle George series
 Choice of Violence. Dodd Mead 1961
 Murder Sweet and Sour. Dodd Mead 1965
 Around Dark Corners. Dodd Mead 1970, collection of stories
 The Copycat Killers. Dodd Mead 1983, 
 Price of Silence. Dodd Mead 1984, 
 Death by Fire. Dodd Mead 1986, 
 Pattern for Terror. Carroll & Graf Publishers 1990,

Hotel Manager Pierre Chambrun
 The Cannibal Who Overate. Dodd Mead 1962
 The Shape of Fear. Boardman Books 1963
 The Evil that Men Do. Boardman 1966
 The Golden Trap. Dodd Mead 1967
 The Gilded Nightmare. Dodd Mead 1968
 Girl Watcher's Funeral. Dodd Mead 1969
 The Deadly Joke. Dodd Mead 1971, 
 Birthday, Deathday. Dodd Mead 1972, 
 Walking Dead Man. Dodd Mead 1973, 
 Bargain with Death. Dodd Mead 1974, 
 Time of Terror. Dodd Mead 1975, 
 The Fourteen Dilemma. Dodd Mead 1976, 
 Death After Breakfast. Dodd Mead 1978, 
 Random Killer. Dodd Mead 1979, 
 Beware Young Lovers. Dodd Mead 1980, 
 Murder in Luxury. Dodd Mead 1981, 
 With Intent to Kill, Dodd Mead 1982, 
 Murder in High Places. Dodd Mead 1983, 
 Remember to Kill Me. Dodd Mead 1984, 
 Murder Round the Clock. Dodd Mead 1985, 
 Nightmare Time. Dodd Mead 1986, 
 Murder Goes Round and Round. Dodd Mead 1988,

John Jericho series
 The Sniper. Dodd Mead 1965
 Hide Her from Every Eye. Dodd Mead 1966
 The Creeping Hours. Dodd Mead 1966
 Dead Woman of the Year. Dodd Mead 1967
 Girl with Six Fingers. Dodd Mead 1969
 Plague of Violence. Dodd Mead 1970, 
 The Battles of Jericho. Crippen & Landru, 2008. Short stories

Julian Quist series
 Don't Drop Dead Tomorrow. Dodd Mead 1971, 
 Champagne Killer. Dodd Mead 1972, 
 Beautiful Dead. Dodd Mead 1973, 
 The Judas Freak. Dodd Mead 1974, 
 Honeymoon with Death. Dodd Mead 1975, 
 Die After Dark. Dodd Mead 1976, 
 Steel Palace. Dodd Mead 1977, 
 Deadly Trap. Dodd Mead 1978, 
 Homicidal Horse. Dodd Mead 1979, 
 The Death Mask. Dodd Mead 1980, 
 Sow Death, Reap Death. Dodd Mead 1981, 
 Past, Present and Murder. Dodd Mead 1982, 
 Murder out of Wedlock. Dodd Mead 1983, 
 Substitute Victim. Dodd Mead 1984, 
 The Party Killer. Dodd Mead 1986, 
 Kill and Kill Again. Dodd Mead 1987,

Standalones
 Cat and Mouse. Chicago Royce Publishers 1940
 Where the Snow Was Red. Dodd Mead 1946
 Chinese Nightmare. Dell Publishing 1947
 The Assassins. Dodd Mead 1955
 Kingdom of Death. Dodd Mead 1960
 The Deadly Friend. Dodd Mead 1961
 Murder Clear Track Fast. Dodd Mead 1961
 The Tarnished Angel. Dodd Mead 1963
 Day the Children Vanished. Pocket Books 1976, 
 Murder as Usual. Dodd Mead 1977,

Anthologies
 Death Wears a Copper Necktie: and other stories. Walter Edwards Company 1946
 Alfred Hitchcock's Daring Detectives. Random House 1969,

as Philip Owen 
 Mystery at a Country Inn. Berkshire Press 1979,

References

External links 
 
 New York Times obituary
 Philips at the Golden Age of Detection Wiki
 review of Philip's "Jericho" series by author Allan Guthrie

 Once a Pulp Man: The Secret Life of Judson P. Philips as Hugh Pentecost by author Audrey Parente

1903 births
1989 deaths
20th-century American novelists
American male novelists
American mystery writers
Deaths from emphysema
Edgar Award winners
Nero Award winners
People from Northfield, Massachusetts
Novelists from Massachusetts
Columbia University alumni
20th-century American male writers